Thomas Lee Dillon (July 9, 1950 – October 21, 2011) was an American serial killer who shot and killed five men in southeastern Ohio, beginning April 1, 1989 and continuing until April 1992. He was nicknamed "Killer" for boasting about shooting hundreds of animals.

Life and crimes
Dillon was born in Canton, Ohio and was a resident of nearby Magnolia. He had a wife and son and was employed for twelve years as a draftsman at the Canton Ohio Waterworks. He graduated in 1972 from Ohio State University in journalism. 

Between the period of April 1, 1989 to April 5, 1992, Dillon shot and killed five people in Ohio. His fourth victim, Claude Hawkins, was shot on federal property and was the reason the FBI stepped in to join the investigation along with officers from the other three counties and the Ohio Department of Natural Resources. It was after this that the death of Kevin Loring was changed from an accident to a homicide.

Ten days after the task force meeting, Dillon would shoot his fifth victim, Gary Bradley, in Noble County, Ohio. Dillon was placed under surveillance in 1992 when a friend reported him after hearing the task force's initial press release concerning the murders. Larry Oller of Barnhill, Ohio was later shot at by Dillon while out hunting in Tuscarawas County, but he escaped uninjured. 

In August 1992, after a press conference to build leads from the public, Dillion's high school friend Richard Fry would tell investigators that Dillion's behavior was "suspicious", and would shoot out store windows, street signs, and cars. While under surveillance, he was seen burning buildings and killing animals. He was surveyed also by an aviation unit.

Arrest 
In July 1992, Thomas Dillon reached a plea agreement with prosecutors involving two counts of possessing an illegal silencer and he was placed under probation. The agreement prohibited him from possessing firearms. He was then arrested for buying a handgun at a Cleveland gun show on November 27, 1992.

After an initial search of Dillon's home, they found no weapons or ammo. They asked the public for information and asked anyone who bought or sold a gun or ammunition from or to Dillon to come forward. An individual told investigators he’d bought a Swedish Mauser rifle and after a F.B.I. ballistics test, the gun was confirmed to be a 100 percent match with the one used to kill Bradley and a 90 percent match for Hawkins’ homicide.

After the death penalty was removed as an option for punishment, Dillon admitted to the killings. On July 12, 1993 at the Noble County Courthouse, Dillon pleaded guilty to the five murders. Dillon was incarcerated at the Southern Ohio Correctional Facility for five consecutive sentences of thirty years to life for aggravated murders.

Victims
Dillon's shooting victims were:
 
 Donald Welling, 35, of Strasburg, Ohio on April 1, 1989, while walking or jogging on Tuscarawas County Road 94.
 Jamie Paxton, 21, of Bannock, Ohio on Nov. 10, 1990, while deer hunting in Belmont County.
 Kevin Loring, 30, of Duxbury, Massachusetts on Nov. 28, 1990, while deer hunting in Muskingum County.
 Claude Hawkins, 48, of Mansfield, Ohio on March 14, 1992, while fishing at Wills Creek dam in Coshocton County.
 Gary Bradley, 44, of Williamstown, West Virginia, on April 5, 1992, while fishing in Caldwell, Ohio in Noble County.

Dillon was also investigated in connection with the unsolved shooting death of John Joseph Harvat on November 28, 1984, at a hunting camp in Wetmore Township, McKean County, Pennsylvania. In 1993, officials in Coshocton County notified the Pennsylvania State Police that Dillon had been named a suspect in several similar shootings in Ohio, but Dillon refused to discuss Harvat's case with police.

In 2020, suspicion was placed on Dillon of having murdered Doug Estes and Jim Bennett, two hunters shot in rural Michigan in 1990. A Michigan man, Jeff Titus, had been convicted of the murders in 2002. In 2023, a judge ordered the murder convictions to be vacated and for Titus to be released.

Death

Dillon was hospitalized on October 4, and on October 21, 2011, he died in the prison wing at Corrections Medical Center in Columbus, Ohio, aged 61, after being ill for nearly three weeks due to an unspecified illness.

In popular culture

 The Discovery Channel television series The FBI Files episode "Human Prey," S1, E3, Air date: 1998, depicts how a letter to a local newspaper provides a crucial clue to end Dillon's killing spree.
 The Court TV (now TruTV) television series Crime Stories disclosed Dillon's crimes in the episode "The Silent Sniper," S7, E3, 46:00 Minutes, Air date: 2009.
 In 2013 Investigation Discovery show Evil, I made an episode about the case (Season 2 Episode 5 - "Hunting Humans")
 The Oxygen television series, Twisted Killers highlights the case on the 7th Episode "The Sniper's Bullet"

See also

 List of serial killers in the United States
 List of serial killers by number of victims

References

1950 births
1989 murders in the United States
2011 deaths
20th-century American criminals
American criminal snipers
American male criminals
American people convicted of murder
American people who died in prison custody
American prisoners sentenced to life imprisonment
American serial killers
Criminals from Ohio
Male serial killers
People convicted of murder by Ohio
People from Canton, Ohio
People from Magnolia, Ohio
Prisoners sentenced to life imprisonment by Ohio
Prisoners who died in Ohio detention
Serial killers who died in prison custody
Violence against men in North America